Pierre Dauzier (31 January 1939 in Périgueux – 28 September 2007 in Paris) was a French businessman.

Dauzier was the president of Havas for 12 years, and left the company in 1998. He joined the company in 1963, when he was 24 years old.

References

People from Périgueux
1939 births
2007 deaths
20th-century French businesspeople